Schuy-Rush Airport is a public-use airport located  west of Rushville, Illinois, United States. The airport is publicly owned by the City of Rushville.

The airport received over $300,00 from the Illinois Department of Transportation as part of the Rebuild Illinois program during the COVID-19 pandemic to help it upgrade its facilities.

Facilities and aircraft 
The airport has one runway. There is no FBO at the airport, and no fuel is available.

For the 12-month period ending May 31, 2021, the airport had 83 operations per month, or about 1000 per year. This traffic was made up completely of general aviation. For the same time period, there were four aircraft based at Schuy-Rush: three single-engine airplanes and one ultralight.

References 

Airports in Illinois